VA-144 was an Attack Squadron of the U.S. Navy, nicknamed the Roadrunners. It was established as VA-116 on 1 December 1955, and redesignated VA-144 on 23 February 1959. The squadron was disestablished on 29 January 1971.

Operational history
 26 May–18 August 1958: The squadron was embarked on  during its transit from the east coast, via South America, to its new home port at Naval Air Station Alameda, California.
 July 1959: The squadron, embarked on Ranger, maintained station off the coast of Taiwan due to increased tension between Taiwan and Communist China.
 June–November 1964: The squadron participated in Yankee Team Operations. These operations involved support for photo reconnaissance missions over Laos. During these operations, the squadron was the first operational unit to fly with and drop the Snakeye weapon.
 5 August 1964: VA-144 participated in Operation Pierce Arrow, air strikes against North Vietnamese torpedo boats, their bases and supporting facilities in retaliation for the attacks on the American destroyers the previous day. Strikes were flown against the North Vietnamese home port of Hon Gai and the naval craft located there. During this engagement Lieutenant (jg) Everett Alvarez, Jr.’s A-4C was hit by antiaircraft fire and he was forced to eject. A rescue attempt failed and he was captured. He became the first American naval prisoner-of-war during the Vietnam War and was held by the North Vietnamese until 1973.
 20 December 1967: Commanders J. R. Powell, Jr. and R. C. Bos were awarded the Silver Star for planning and leading a successful strike against the heavily defended Haiphong Thermal Power Plant (west).
 24 April 1967: VA-144's aircraft participated in a strike against the Kép Air Base, the first time the airfield was hit during the air war over North Vietnam.

Home port assignments
The squadron was assigned to these home ports, effective on the dates shown:
 NAS Miramar – 01 Dec 1955
 NAS Lemoore – May 1962

Aircraft assignment
The squadron first received the following aircraft on the dates shown:
 F7U-3M Cutlass – Dec 1955
 FJ-4B Fury – 15 Oct 1957
 A-4C Skyhawk – 04 Jun 1962
 A-4E Skyhawk – Jul 1967
 A-4F Skyhawk – 12 Nov 1969

See also
 List of squadrons in the Dictionary of American Naval Aviation Squadrons
 Attack aircraft
 List of inactive United States Navy aircraft squadrons
 History of the United States Navy

References

External links

Attack squadrons of the United States Navy
Wikipedia articles incorporating text from the Dictionary of American Naval Aviation Squadrons